Mario Becerril Serrano (5 August 1917 – 7 December 2018) was a Mexican equestrian who competed in the 1952 Summer Olympics.  He turned 100 in August 2017, and died on 7 December 2018.

References

1917 births
2018 deaths
Mexican centenarians
Mexican male equestrians
Olympic equestrians of Mexico
Equestrians at the 1952 Summer Olympics
Men centenarians